J. Stanley Marshall (January 27, 1923 – June 8, 2014) was an American educator. He was president of Florida State University from February 1969 to August 1976. He also established the James Madison Institute in 1987. He was born in Cheswick, Pennsylvania.

Marshall served on the Board of Governors of the State University System of Florida.

He married Ruth Cratty of Butler, Pennsylvania in the early 1940s. They had three children together-daughter Sue Jones and sons David and John. After he and Ruth divorced in 1964, he married Shirley Slade of Longview, Texas in 1966. The couple had 2 children—daughter Kimberly Rosero and son Drew. His eldest son David Marshall has 2 sons Matthew and Peter. Sue Jones, his eldest daughter and second-eldest child, has 2 sons McLain and Carson and 1 daughter Kimberly. John Marshall, his middle son, has 4 children-daughter Katherine and sons Luke, William and Matthew. His youngest daughter Kim Rosero has 3 sons Jackson, Benjamin, and Carson. Drew, his youngest child, has 1 daughter Lilly and 1 son James.

He died on June 8, 2014, at the age of 91 after having suffered a heart attack a month prior.

References

1923 births
2014 deaths
People from Cheswick, Pennsylvania
American members of the Churches of Christ
Presidents of Florida State University
Harding University alumni